Bdood is a dockless bike-sharing company, located in Tehran, Iran. first featured in Iranian tech exhibition Elecomp 97 in 2018, it claims to be the first and exclusively the only bike-sharing business in Iran.

As is common with dockless bike sharing companies, users can use a smartphone app to rent the bicycles at a minimum rate of 15,000IRR (about 0.10US$) per 30 minutes of usage, and can leave the bicycle anywhere within the operating area.

In 2017, it had deployed over 5,000 bikes in the central parts of Tehran, and months later it added about 700 more bikes in the north-west regions of the city. The company plans to increase the total number of bikes to 250,000 which, according to the firm,  is the maximum capacity the city can handle.

History 
After being featured in the 2018 Elecomp, an Iranian technology Exhibition, it officially started operating in District 2 of Tehran on December 18, 2018. Initially, its business model was a combination of subscription and pay-as-you-go. Charging an initial refundable deposit of 159,000 IRT, with a required insurance fee of 30,900 IRT, its registration cost added up to 189,900 IRT. It also charged the subscribed users 1,500 IRT for every 30 minutes they were using the bikes.

2019 Bike re-collection 
Following the 2019–2020 Iranian protests, BDOOD bikes across Tehran were collected and removed from the stations. Chief of Communication and International Relations of Tehran municipality tweeted that the bikes were collected to avoid damages due to the recent events. Two months later, it was announced that the company had started refunding the deposit it received from its customers.

Usage 
Use of the system requires the firm's mobile application, registration and payment of a deposit 
Customers can use the company's mobile app on their smartphones to locate nearby bicycles. Each bike is equipped with a Bluetooth and Internet connection, and has a QR code on the frame, which the customer scans to unlock the bike. When they  finish their ride, they manually lock and leave the bike in any parking spot to be ready for the next user.

See also 
 Bicycle-sharing system
 List of bicycle-sharing systems

References 

Bicycle sharing in Iran
Companies based in Tehran
Iranian companies established in 2017
Transport companies established in 2017